Kenneth Rinehurst (born July 3, 1964) is an American professional wrestler and manager, better known by his ring name, Jack Victory. He is perhaps best known for his appearances with the Universal Wrestling Federation and the World Class Wrestling Association in the mid-1980s, with World Championship Wrestling between 1988 and 1991 and with Extreme Championship Wrestling between 1998 and 2001.

Professional wrestling career

Universal Wrestling Federation (1984–1987)
Rinehurst debuted in 1984 in the Oklahoma City, Oklahoma-based Universal Wrestling Federation under the ring name Jack Victory. He went on to wrestle throughout the Southeastern United States. Early in his career, Victory accompanied The Sheepherders to ringside while carrying the New Zealand flag.

Victory formed a tag team with John Tatum. Managed by Tatum's girlfriend, Missy Hyatt, Victory and Tatum won the UWF Tag Team Championship in 1986. Victory, Tatum and Hyatt joined "Hot Stuff International", a stable headed by "Hot Stuff" Eddie Gilbert.

World Class Championship Wrestling (1985–1988)
In 1985, Victory began appearing with the Texas-based World Class Championship Wrestling promotion. He won the WCCW Television Championship from David Peterson in December 1985, losing the title to Mark Youngblood less than a month later.

Victory and Tatum won the WCWA Texas Tag Team Championship on three occasions in 1988, trading the titles with Shaun and Steve Simpson. On the 30th of November 1987, Victory and Tatum also teamed together in the Fort Worth, Texas-based Wild West Wrestling (where they won the WWW Tag Team Championship in 1987).  Victory and John Tatum defeated Missing Link and Jeff Raitz in a tournament final to become the first champions of the Wild west tag team championships. These titles would unify with the WCCW tag team championships on the 12th of October 1988.

Jim Crockett Promotions (1988–1991)
In the late 1980s, Victory began wrestling for Jim Crockett Promotions as Jacko Victory, where he formed a tag team with Rip Morgan known as The New Zealand Militia.

At the 1989 NWA pay-per-view Chi-Town Rumble, Victory replaced Dennis Condrey as Randy Rose and Paul E. Dangerously's tag team partner. The three men were defeated by the Midnight Express and Jim Cornette in a losing team leaves the NWA match. Victory wrestled at four Clash of the Champions events in 1989, appearing as the masked heel jobbers "Russian Assassin #2", "the Blackmailer", "the Terrorist", and "the Super Destroyer". In the same year, Victory and Morgan were repackaged as "the Royal Family" and given a manager, Lord Littlebrook. The Royal Family family was one of eight teams entered in a tournament for the vacant WCW United States Tag Team Championship. The group lost in the first round to eventual tournament winners Flyin' Brian and "Z-Man" Tom Zenk. WCW held the "Pat O'Connor International Tag Team Tournament" as part of the 1990 Starrcade with eight teams representing various countries. The storyline was that the Royal Family had won a tournament in Australia to earn the rights to represent Australian and New Zealand, in reality none of the teams had won qualifying tournaments. Victory and Morgan lost to "Team Japan" (Masa Saito and The Great Muta) in the first round of the tournament. The Royal Family's last significant appearance with WCW was on 28 April 1991 where they teamed up with Black Bart as they unsuccessfully challenged the team of the Junkyard Dog, Ricky Morton and Tommy Rich for the WCW World Six-Man Tag Team Championship.

Various promotions (1991–1998)
In 1991 Victory and Morgan made their way to the Global Wrestling Federation in Dallas, Texas this time as The Maulers. The duo competed in the tournament for the first ever GWF Tag Team Championship. In the first round they defeated "Wet'n'Wild" (Steve Ray and Sunny Beach), followed by a victory over Chaz and Terry Garvin. In the third round, the semi-finals of the tournament the Maulers lost to eventual tournament winners Chris Walker and Steve Simpson. Wrestling as the Maulers, Victory and Morgan also wrestled a dark match at a WWF Superstars taping in Mobile, Alabama on March 9, 1992, defeating Jim Cooper and John Allen. The Maulers did not stay in the GWF after the tournament, instead moved on to Smokey Mountain Wrestling (SMW) in Tennessee. They competed in a tournament to determine the first ever SMW Tag Team Champion. In the first round the Maulers defeated the Rich Brothers (Davey Rich and Johnny Rich), but lost to The Fantastics (Bobby Fulton and Jackie Fulton) in the second round to be eliminated from the tournament. Their short lived run in SMW was the last time Morgan and Victory teamed together on a regular basis. In the latter half of 1992, he was a regular for Consejo Mundial de Lucha Libre, wrestling as Titán. After his time in Mexico, he returned to the American independents.

Extreme Championship Wrestling (1998–2001)

In 1998, Victory debuted in Extreme Championship Wrestling as a mercenary hired to assault New Jack. His wrestling ended for ECW when he broke his leg at 1998's November to Remember in a tag team match pitting himself and Justin Credible against Tommy Dreamer and Jake "The Snake" Roberts when he was backdropped over the top rope by Dreamer. While using a wheelchair for rehabilitation, Victory became the manager of Steve Corino. When his leg healed, Victory began interfering in Corino's matches on behalf of his client. Along with Corino, Victory was a member of the stable known as The Network. He remained in ECW until the promotion declared bankruptcy in April 2001, defeating C.W. Anderson on the promotion's last show in January.

Independent circuit (2001–present)
Following the closure of ECW, Victory began wrestling on the independent circuit. Along with several other ECW alumni, he made several appearances with the Premier Wrestling Federation, winning the PWF Tag Team Championship in February 2002 and the PWF Xtreme Championship in August 2002. He also wrestled for Pro-Pain Pro Wrestling Pro Wrestling Zero1, Ring of Honor.

Championships and accomplishments
Premier Wrestling Federation
PWF Tag Team Championship (1 time) – with Guillotine LeGrande
PWF Xtreme Championship (1 time)
Universal Wrestling Federation
UWF Tag Team Championship (1 time) – with John Tatum
Western Ohio Wrestling
WOW Tag Team Championship (1 time) - with Rip Morgan
Wild West Wrestling
WWW Tag Team Championship (2 times) – with John Tatum
World Class Championship Wrestling/World Class Wrestling Association
WCCW Television Championship (1 time)
WCWA Texas Tag Team Championship (3 times) – with John Tatum
Wild West tag team titles (1 time) 
Wrestling Observer Newsletter awards
Rookie of the Year (1985)

References

External links 
 
 

American male professional wrestlers
Faux Russian professional wrestlers
Living people
Professional wrestlers from New Jersey
Professional wrestling managers and valets
Sportspeople from Atlantic City, New Jersey
1964 births